Joseph Jenkins may refer to:
 Joseph Jenkins (diarist) (1818–1898), Welsh-Australian diarist
 Joseph Jenkins (pastor) (1859–1929), Calvinistic Methodist preacher
 Joseph John Jenkins (1811–1885), English engraver and water-colour painter
 Joseph Wiley Jenkins (1901–1950), African-American pharmacist, resident of Jenkins House (West Palm Beach, Florida)
 Joseph Willcox Jenkins (1928–2014), American composer, professor of music, and musician
 Joe Jenkins (1890–1974), American baseball player
 Joe Jenkins (scholar), a Kahlil Gibran scholar, Research Fellow at the Kahlil Gibran Research and Studies Project